Stillwater Central Railroad  is a shortline railroad operating in Oklahoma.

SLWC operates a branch from Stillwater to a connection with BNSF at Pawnee. Its primary business is handling mined, mineral, and industrial products.

History
In July 1998, SLWC leased  of rail line from the State of Oklahoma.  This included both the line between Sapulpa (near Tulsa) and Del City (near Oklahoma City), known as the Sooner Sub, as well as a branch line from Stillwater to Pawnee (geographically separated from the other line leased).

In January 2002, SLWC acquired from the BNSF, and began operating,  of rail line from Wheatland (south of Oklahoma City) to Long. In January 2005, SLWC leased from BNSF a line from Wheatland to Oklahoma City.

In January 2010, in conjunction with BNSF, the SLWC launched unit crude oil train service between the Bakken oil fields and a terminal in Oklahoma.

In July 2014 SLWC agreed to purchase the Sooner Sub line from the State of Oklahoma, subject to approval by the Surface Transportation Board; the STB approved the transaction on July 29, 2014.
The purchase contract reportedly included a requirement to start a six-month daily passenger service trial run over the line before August 2019, with a financial penalty for not meeting the deadline set at $2.8 million.   The agreement also called for the state to retain the right to acquire a passenger rail easement should the company decide not to operate such a service after 10 years.  Finally, the agreement required the line to be accessible to other rail companies, and for the SLWC to upgrade the track from FRA Class II to Class III, to enable trains to safely travel at faster speeds.  Class III permits freight traffic up to 40 mph and passenger traffic up to 60 mph.  In June 2018, SLWC, being only a freight operator, issued a request for proposal to begin the process of securing a private rail carrier to provide the passenger service, locally known as the Eastern Flyer, for an initial period of 10 years, along the route between Sapulpa and Del City, but with the expectation of working with city officials to expand it to the downtowns of Tulsa and Oklahoma City.  Government officials were not optimistic that the original August 2019 deadline would be met.  On August 5, 2019, the Stillwater Central opted to default under the agreement and pay the contractual $2.8 million penalty for not establishing the service.  However, the company had accomplished the upgrading of the rail line as agreed.

References

External links
 Watco Companies - Stillwater Central Railroad

Oklahoma railroads
Watco
Spin-offs of the BNSF Railway